Pan Am Flight 708 (PA 708) was a cargo flight that crashed on initial approach less than  west-southwest of its destination airport, Berlin Tegel in Germany, in the early morning hours of November 15, 1966. The flight was operated by a Pan American World Airways (Pan Am) Boeing 727-21, registration  name Clipper München, routing from Frankfurt Airport. All three crew members perished. The cause was undetermined because US investigators were not allowed to survey the impact site near Dallgow in what was then East Germany, and only half of the aircraft remains were returned by Soviet military authorities in East Germany to their US counterparts in former West Berlin.

Flight details
Flight 708 usually landed at Tempelhof Airport. But because of runway maintenance at Tempelhof, Pan Am shifted its flights to Tegel Airport. At the time of the accident, weather was poor and it was snowing.

The Soviet authorities returned about 50% of the wreckage. Some major components were not returned, including the flight data and cockpit voice recorders, flight control systems, navigation and communication equipment. 

At the time of the crash, the Soviet Union did not belong to the International Civil Aviation Organization (ICAO). Nations belonging to ICAO allow reciprocal visits by official observers in order to improve aviation safety.

References

External links
Aviation query, National Transportation Safety Board
 
Satellite image of crash location Google Maps

Aviation accidents and incidents in 1966
Aviation accidents and incidents in Germany
Accidents and incidents involving the Boeing 727
708
1966 in East Germany
Soviet Union–United States relations
1960s in West Berlin
November 1966 events in Europe